Izabela Vidovic (born ) is an American actress. She began as a child actress, and is known for her roles in the films Homefront and Wonder, and for her recurring role as Taylor Shaw in the Freeform television series The Fosters.

Early life 
Vidovic was born in Chicago, Illinois, to Croatian parents Mario Vidović and Elizabeta Bašić. Her mother is a filmmaker, actress, and writer, born to Croats from the town of Busovača in Bosnia. Vidovic, who can speak Croatian, started performing in stage productions by the time she was seven, appearing in Mary Poppins, Camp Rock, and Annie. She moved onto film and television productions in 2011.

Career 
Vidovic has appeared in several series on The CW. In 2013, she played Charlotte on The 100 in the first-season episodes "Murphy’s Law" and "Earth Kills". In 2017, Vidovic first played a young Kara Danvers / Kara Zor-El in the Supergirl season 3 flashback episode "Midvale", then in 2021 reprised this role for two time-travel episodes of season 6. In 2018, she had a multi-episode arc in the fourth season of iZombie as Isobel. In 2017, she played the lead character's sister Olivia in the film Wonder. In 2019, Vidovic had a recurring role in the fourth season of Veronica Mars on Hulu.

Filmography

Film

Television

References

External links
 

2001 births
21st-century American actresses
Actresses from Chicago
American child actresses
American film actresses
American people of Croatian descent
American people of Bosnia and Herzegovina descent
American television actresses
Living people